The Battle of the Meander took place in December 1147, during the Second Crusade. The French crusader army, led by Louis VII of France, successfully fended off an ambush by the Seljuks of Rum at the Meander River.

Background
King Louis VII led the French army on the march across Europe and Asia Minor to Jerusalem. The army decided to march along the coast of Asia Minor, because the defeat of Emperor Conrad of Germany and his army at Dorylaeum had made it clear that marching inland was too dangerous. In December 1147 the army was marching across the valley of the river Maeander to reach the major port of Adalia. Odo of Deuil, who participated in the march, makes it clear that the Maeander Valley was treacherous. Its mountain crags and slopes allowed the Turks to constantly harass the Crusaders with lightning raids.

Battle
The Turks launched a particularly heavy ambush as the Crusaders attempted to finally cross the river. They used their usual tactic of attacking and then quickly retreating before the enemy could regroup and counter-attack. On this occasion however, Louis had already placed his strongest knights to the front, side and rear, allowing these tough troops to engage the Turks before they could do much damage. The Turks suffered heavy casualties, although many were able to escape back into the mountains on their swift horses. According to William of Tyre, writing later, the Crusaders also managed to capture many of the raiders. Neither William nor Odo reported on total Crusader casualties, although it can be assumed they were light, because only one significant nobleman, Milo of Nogent, was killed. A rumour that defence was led by an unknown white-clad knight gained popularity among the Crusaders following the battle.

Aftermath
The victory was not enough to stop the Turkish attacks. Just days after the Battle of the Meander, the French army suffered a catastrophic defeat at Mount Cadmus. Nevertheless, the historian Jonathon Phillips says that the Battle of the Meander is important because it helps in fully understanding the failure of the Second Crusade. He says that this engagement shows that the failure of the Crusade was not due to any inferior martial abilities of the Crusaders, as may seem the case.

References

Bibliography

Primary sources
Odo of Deuil, De profectione Ludovici VII in Orientem, trans. V.G. Berry (New York: W.W. Norton and Co., 1948).
William of Tyre, A History of Deeds Done Beyond the Sea, trans. E.A. Babcock and A.C. Krey (Columbia University Press, 1943).

Secondary sources
Jonathan Phillips, The Second Crusade: Extending the frontiers of Christendom, (Yale University Press, 2007).

Battles of the Second Crusade
Battles involving the Sultanate of Rum
Conflicts in 1147
Battles involving France
1147 in Asia